Polydrusini is a weevil tribe in the subfamily Entiminae.

Genera 
 Apodrosus
 Auchmeresthes
 Bremondiscytropus
 Cautoderus
 Gobidrusus
 Homapterus
 Liophloeus
 Pachyrhinus
 Polydrosodes
 Polydrusus
 Pythis
 Rungsythropus
 Sciadrusus
 Sitonapterus

References 

 Schönherr, C.J. 1823: Curculionides [Tabula synoptica familiae Curculionidum]. Isis von Oken, 1823(10): 1132–1146. https://biodiversitylibrary.org/page/13257284
 Alonso-Zarazaga, M.A.; Lyal, C.H.C. 1999: A world catalogue of families and genera of Curculionoidea (Insecta: Coleoptera) (excepting Scolytidae and Platypodidae). Entomopraxis, Barcelona.
Alonso-Zarazaga, M.A., Barrios, H., Borovec, R., Bouchard, P., Caldara, R., Colonnelli, E., Gültekin, L., Hlaváč, P., Korotyaev, B., Lyal, C.H.C., Machado, A., Meregalli, M., Pierotti, H., Ren, L., Sánchez-Ruiz, M., Sforzi, A., Silfverberg, H., Skuhrovec, J., Trýzna, M., Castro, A.J.V. de & Yunakov, N.N. (2017) Cooperative catalogue of palaearctic Coleoptera Curculionoidea. Monografias electrónicas SEA 8.
Bouchard, P., Bousquet, Y., Davies, A., Alonso-Zarazaga, M., Lawrence, J., Lyal, C., Newton, A., Reid, C., Schmitt, M., Slipinski, A. & Smith, A. (2011) Family-group names in Coleoptera (Insecta). ZooKeys 88, 1–972. https://doi.org/10.3897/zookeys.88.807
 Subfamily Entiminae - atlas of weevils (Curculionidae) of Russia
 ICZN, 1981: OPINION 1179 Polydrusus Germar, 1817 and Phyllobius Germar, 1824 (Insecta, Coleoptera): conserved in Accordance with current Usage. The Bulletin of zoological nomenclature 38: 117-119

Entiminae
Beetle tribes